The Olympic Committee of Serbia is the National Olympic Committee representing Serbia. It organizes the country's representatives at the Olympic Games and other multisport events.

Members of the committee are 47 sports federations, which elect the Executive Council composed of the president and seventeen members.

History 

The Serbian Olympic Club was established on February 23, 1910. Major Svetomir Đukić is considered the founder of the Olympic movement in Serbia. In 1912 the Serbian Olympic Club has changed its name to the Olympic Committee of Serbia and that year it was recognized by the IOC. After Creation of Yugoslavia, Yugoslav Olympic Committee as created in Zagreb, Croatia in 1919, before moving to Belgrade in 1927. It was recognized by IOC in 1920. After renaming the country FR Yugoslavia to Serbia and Montenegro, it changed its name to the Olympic Committee of Serbia and Montenegro. In 2006 Serbia became an independent country following the Montenegrin independence referendum, and the Olympic Committee of Serbia returned to its original name. Belgrade, the capital of Serbia and Yugoslavia submitted two separate bids to host the Summer Olympic Games. They wanted to organize the 1992 Summer Olympics and 1996 Summer Olympics.

List of presidents

IOC members

Executive committee
The 2017-2020 committee of the OCS is represented by:
 President: Božidar Maljković
 IOC member: Nenad Lalović
 Honorary IOC Member: Borislav Stanković
 President of Sports Commission of OCS: Ivan Miljković
 Members: 
 10 Members from the Olympic Sports Federations: Mirko Nišović (president of Canoe Federation), Željko Trajković (president of Wrestling Federation), Veselin Jevrosimović (president of Athletics Federation), Zoran Gajić (president of Volleyball Federation), Predrag Danilović (president of Basketball Federation), Snežana Žugić (president of Diving Association), Nenad Petković (president of Shooting Federation), Iva Popović (president of Synchronized Swimming Federation), Milorad Krivokapić (president of Water Polo Federation), Vladeta Radivojević (president of Ski Association) 
 3 Members who were chosen by the OCS: Žarko Zečević, Bogdan Obradović, Milica Mandić 
 Member of Sports Association of Serbia: Aleksandar Šoštar

Member federations
The Serbian National Federations are the organizations that coordinate all aspects of their individual sports. They are responsible for training, competition and development of their sports. There are currently 35 Olympic Summer and 7 Olympic Winter Sport Federations along with 5 other Sports Federations in Serbia.

Olympic Sport Federations

Other Federations

Awards

Decision by the Board, then the Yugoslav Olympic Committee, JOK since 1994. at the end of each calendar year proclaimed the most successful athletes. Initially declared sportswoman and sportsman, and later introduced the award for best the women's team, the men's team, coach, young sportsperson and youth team. The competition includes results from current Olympic sports, also and from Chess Olympiad.

See also
Serbia at the Olympics
List of Yugoslav Olympic medalists

References

External links
 Official website 

Serbia
Serbia at the Olympics
Ol
1910 establishments in Serbia